Frederick George Luther Ford (10 February 1916 – 16 October 1981) was an English former footballer and manager.

References

External links
 
 Manager Profile - Swindon-Town-FC.co.uk

1916 births
1981 deaths
English footballers
Association football wing halves
Erith & Belvedere F.C. players
Charlton Athletic F.C. players
Millwall F.C. players
Carlisle United F.C. players
Swindon Town F.C. managers
Bristol City F.C. managers
Bristol Rovers F.C. managers
English football managers